William James Strang (7 October 1883 – 9 May 1937) was an Australian rules footballer who played with South Melbourne in the Victorian Football League (VFL).

Family
He married Frances Eleanor Collins in 1905.

Four sons played senior football in the VFL; Allan and Colin as well as Richmond premiership stars of the 1930s Doug and Gordon. Two grandsons were members of the Tiger's premiership team in 1967, Geoff Strang (son of Doug) and John Perry (son of his daughter Edna "Bob" Perry, née Strang), with Geoff backing up again in 1969.

Strang was also a Justice of the Peace (J.P.) in Albury.

Football
Strang was a strong aerialist from Albury, used as both a follower and forward. He kicked three of South Melbourne's six goals, from centre half-forward, in their 1907 VFL Grand Final loss to Carlton.

Strang spent the next period of his career in New South Wales. After returning to Albury to start a business, he played for the Albury Football Club.

Strang returned to South Melbourne in 1913 and was the club's leading goal-kicker with 29 goals.

Military service
He served overseas with the First AIF in the 1st Light Horse Field Ambulance.

Death
He died (suddenly) at Albury on 9 May 1937.

Footnotes

References
 Hogan P: The Tigers Of Old, Richmond FC, (Melbourne), 1996. 
 
 First World War Nominal Roll: Private William James Strang (2165), collection of the Australian War Memorial.
 First World War Embarkation Roll: Private William James Strang (2165), collection of the Australian War Memorial.
 First World War Service Record: Private William James Strang (2165), National Archives of Australia.

External links
 
 

1883 births
1937 deaths
Australian Rules footballers: place kick exponents
Albury Football Club players
Sydney Swans players
Australian military personnel of World War I
Australian rules footballers from Albury
Military personnel from New South Wales